San Luis, officially the Municipality of San Luis, is a 3rd class municipality in the province of Pampanga, Philippines. According to the 2020 census, it had a population of 58,551 people.

Geography

Barangays
San Luis is politically subdivided into 17 barangays. Like the town itself, all political subdivisions are named after Catholic saints.

Climate

Demographics

Like other municipalities and cities in Pampanga, its people are mostly Kapampangan.

Religion
Roman Catholicism remains the predominant faith of the townsfolk. Other Christian denominations, such as Iglesia ni Cristo, the United Methodist Church, Members Church of God International, Evangelicals, Ang Iglesia Metodista sa Pilipinas, Baptists, and Born Again Christianity can be found in the municipality.

Economy 

Transportation, trade and commerce in San Luis is concentrated at the town center where the public market, cockpit, municipal hall, church, schools, hospital, clinics, and commercial spaces are situated.

Government
The municipal government is divided into three branches: executive, legislative and judiciary. The judicial branch is administered solely by the Supreme Court of the Philippines. The executive branch is composed of the mayor and the barangay captains for the barangays. The legislative branch is composed of the Sangguniang Bayan (town assembly), Sangguniang Barangay (barangay council), and the Sangguniang Kabataan for the youth sector.

The current mayor of San Luis, Dr. Jayson S. Sagum or also known as Dr. J, and the vice mayor is Mon A. Sagum

Landmarks

St. Aloysius Gonzaga Church

Its façade can compare immeasurably with existing Spanish-style church edifices and architectural design. The church is located in a place that used to be called Cabagsac, referring to the proliferation of fruit bats. In fact, today, a fishnet is permanently installed high above the altar precisely to catch thousands of bats that are roosting inside the church. The interior is dark, has an ambience of antiquity and mystery and overpowering odor of bat urine. The main attraction is the three-tower facade, perhaps one of its kind in the country. Not to be missed is the ancient cemetery located in a hidden corner at the back of the church, with some tombstones dating back to the 1800s and bearing the names of the town's prominent families, including the Elizaldes, Ablazos, Francos, Tarucs, among others.

Education
There is a prime school in the town aside from public elementary and high schools.

Notable personalities

 Luis Taruc (June 21, 1913 - May 4, 2005), founder and leader of Hukbalahap, was born of peasant folks in the farming town of San Luis, Pampanga.

Gallery

References

External links

 San Luis Profile at PhilAtlas.com
 [ Philippine Standard Geographic Code]
Philippine Census Information
Local Governance Performance Management System

Municipalities of Pampanga
Populated places on the Pampanga River